Richard Elvet was an English priest in the  early 15th century.

Elvet was born in Durham and was in the service of John of Gaunt. He succeeded his brother John as Archdeacon of Leicester in 1404. In 1424 he exchanged the Archdeaconry with John Legbourne for the benefice of Sedgefield.

Notes

See also
 Diocese of Lincoln
 Diocese of Peterborough
 Diocese of Leicester
 Archdeacon of Leicester

Archdeacons of Leicester
15th-century English people
People from Durham, England